Keith Gattis (born May 26, 1970) is an American country music artist, songwriter, guitarist and producer. Gattis has released two studio albums and charted one single while signed to RCA Nashville on the Billboard Hot Country Singles & Tracks chart: "Little Drops of My Heart". In 2002, Gattis joined Dwight Yoakam's as band leader and lead electric guitar player and is credited on Yoakam's Blame The Vain. In 2005, Gattis released his critically acclaimed record Big City Blues.  Gattis has collaborated on records with George Jones, George Strait, Kenny Chesney, Willie Nelson, Kid Rock, Randy Houser, Charlie Robison, Gary Allan, Ashley Monroe, Allison Moorer, Waylon Payne, Miranda Lambert, Wade Bowen, Sara Evans, Dwight Yoakam, Brandy Clark, Randy Rogers Band, Randy Travis, Eli Young Band and more.

Kenny Chesney recorded two of Gattis' songs for his 2012 album Welcome to the Fishbowl. One of these, El Cerrito Place, previously on Gattis' Big City Blues record, was released by Chesney and charted as a Billboard top 20 single. El Cerrito Place has also been recorded by Charlie Robison featuring Natalie Maines. Gattis co-wrote Chesney's 2013 single When I See This Bar from the album Life on a Rock, and George Strait's 2013 single I Got a Car.  Gattis has had numerous film and television placements including songs in The Jacket, Sicario, and Nashville.  Gattis has produced and co-wrote projects for many artists including Waylon Payne, Kendell Marvel, Wade Bowen, Randy Houser and Micky & the Motorcars.

www.keithgattis.com

Discography

Albums

Singles

Music videos

List of singles written by Keith Gattis

References

www.keithgattis.com
[ allmusic ((( Keith Gattis > Overview )))]

1971 births
American country singer-songwriters
American male singer-songwriters
Living people
RCA Records Nashville artists
20th-century American singers
21st-century American singers
People from Georgetown, Texas
Country musicians from Texas
20th-century American male singers
21st-century American male singers
Singer-songwriters from Texas